Star of India (Italian: Stella Dell'India) is a 1954 British-Italian swashbuckling adventure film directed by Arthur Lubin and starring Cornel Wilde, Jean Wallace, Herbert Lom, and Walter Rilla. It was shot at the Riverside Studios in London and on location in Aosta. The film's sets were designed by the art director Cedric Dawe. It was released in the United States in April 1956 by United Artists.

Plot 
In seventeenth century France, Pierre St. Laurent, a young nobleman, returns home from the war to discover his lands and chateau have been confiscated by Narbonne, the governor of the province, and sold to Katrina, a Dutch widow.

Katrina agrees to return Pierre's land if he will help her recover the "Star of India," a sapphire that Narbonne stole from the Dutch. Pierre goes to  Narbonne's castle while King Louis XIV is visiting, and befriends the King's mistress, Mme. de Montespan. She tells him that Narbonne keeps the Star of India in the hilt of his sword.

Pierre provokes Narbonne into challenging him to a duel, disarms him and steals the jewel. He escapes and returns the jewel to Katrina. To protect Katrina, Pierre allows himself to be captured, then  escapes and joins Katrina on a ship bound for Holland.

Narbonne and his men catch up with them on the ship, but Pierre kills Narbonne in a duel.

Cast
 Cornel Wilde as Pierre St. Laurent
 Jean Wallace as Katrina
 Herbert Lom as Narbonne
 Yvonne Sanson as Madamoiselle de Montespan
 John Slater as Emile
 Walter Rilla as Van Horst
 Basil Sydney as Louis XIV
 Arnold Bell as Captain
 Leslie Linder as Moulai

Production
The film was based on a script by Herbert Dalmas which was optioned by British producer Raymond Stross. Stross arrived in Hollywood in March 1953 seeking directors and a star. Arthur Lubin signed and went to Britain to make the film the following month. The cast was to be Cornel Wilde, Herbert Lom and Robert Morley as Louis XIV. Wilde's then wife Jean Wallace was also cast.

It was to be the first British widescreen film with Eros agreeing to distribute in the east and United Artists in the West.

Stross said: "We in England can benefit by using a blend of American and English talent in pictures. The results will be better box office in this country and the mutual understanding developed will also be beneficial. You unquestionably will have much to offer us in techniques and may we modestly assume that we will supply stimuli for you." Cornel Wilde claimed he had brought the story to Stross, specifically as a vehicle for himself and Wallace. He also said the script was written by Seton I. Miller, although Miller is not credited.)

Eventually Morley dropped out and was replaced by Basil Sydney. Filming was pushed back. Lubin arrived in England in May and filming started in Italy in June 1953. There was filming at Riverside Studios in London then two weeks of location work in Devon. It was completed by late September 1953.

Director Arthur Lubin called the film "a disaster. Wilde wrote the script, he wanted to act, he wanted to direct. We had a producer who had never made a movie before, and I was stuck in the middle of Italy with a bad script".

20th Century Fox claimed they had rights to the title but later relinquished it at the request of Wilde, who had 55% of the western hemisphere profits.

The film was produced in several versions. Release of the film was delayed due to Wilde's unhappiness that the film did not present his wife in the best light. He sued to restrain release of the film until revisions were made. United Artists agreed to finance money to re-dub and re-score the film.

Reception
The film was not released in the US until 1956. Bosley Crowther in The New York Times said it had a "silly script" but also ""countless costumes, swordplay and high speed horseback riding."

Diabolique magazine wrote the film "should have been good – it has Italian locations and Cornel Wilde had appeared in some decent swashbucklers – but is sunk by a silly script."

References

External links

Star of India at TCMDB
Star of India at BFI
Star of India at Letterbox DVD
Review of film at Variety

1954 films
1950s historical adventure films
British historical adventure films
Italian historical adventure films
Films scored by Nino Rota
1950s English-language films
Films directed by Arthur Lubin
Films set in France
Films set in the 1660s
Films shot in Italy
Films shot at Riverside Studios
Eros Films films
United Artists films
Titanus films
1950s British films
1950s Italian films